Francky Wardan was a British tennis player residing in France.

Warden won the doubles title at the Amateur French Championships in 1896 with Wynes as his partner.  Wardan finished runner-up to Paul Aymé in the singles event of the Amateur French Championships in 1897, losing out 4–6, 6–4, 6–2.

Grand Slam finals

Singles: 1 (0-1)

References

19th-century British people
19th-century male tennis players
British male tennis players
British expatriates in France
French Championships (tennis) champions
Year of birth missing
Year of death missing
Place of birth missing